Municipal Council of Macau, officially known as the Leal Senado (Portuguese for Loyal Senate), was the local government structure in Macau (similar to city councils) during Portuguese colonial rule. The title Leal Senado was bestowed on Macau's government in 1810 by Portugal's prince regent João, who later became King John VI of Portugal. This was a reward for Macau's loyalty to Portugal during the Philippine Dynasty, between 1580 and 1640.

Following the handover in 1999, the Council was replaced by a Provisional Municipal Council and finally replaced by the Institute for Civic and Municipal Affairs of the Macau (Instituto para os Assuntos Cívicos e Municipais). Like its Municipal Council predecessors, the Institute meets at the Leal Senado Building.

Parish

The Council representation was based on parishes:

Functions
 urban affairs
 roads
 public transport
 fire control - Corpo de Bombeiros de Macau
 markets

See also

 Legislative Council of Macau
 Executive Council of Macau
 Secretariat for Transport and Public Works (Macau)

Politics of Macau
Portuguese Macau